Holly Lynch (born 8 October 1986), also known as Holly Walker-Lynch, is a British Labour Party politician serving as the Member of Parliament (MP) for Halifax since 2015. She was appointed as the Shadow Minister for Crime Reduction and Courts in 2021, and has previously served as the Shadow Minister for Immigration and a shadow Department for Environment, Food and Rural Affairs minister.

Early life
Lynch was born in Halifax, Calderdale, West Yorkshire and grew up in Northowram. Her mother was a nurse, and her father a police sergeant. She attended Brighouse High School and studied Politics and History at Lancaster University. She worked in a fast food outlet in Halifax town centre, before joining a small business involved in exporting goods from Halifax.

Political career
Lynch was given just over six weeks to retain the marginal seat of Halifax for Labour having been selected as the party's candidate only at the end of March 2015. Labour's search for a new candidate was triggered by the decision of sitting MP Linda Riordan in February to stand down on health grounds. Her decision, and Lynch's subsequent selection, set up one of the most closely fought contests in Yorkshire in the election. Riordan had held Halifax for Labour in 2010 by a majority of just 1,472 votes, and the seat was considered a key target for the Conservative Party. Lynch was successful on election night and held the Halifax seat for Labour with a majority of only 428 votes over the Conservative candidate.

Lynch made her maiden speech in the House of Commons on 9 June 2015. She stated her priorities as being human rights, the UK's relations with Europe and the protection of services at Calderdale Royal Hospital.

In the 2017 general election, Lynch increased her majority to 5,376 (11.1% of those voting) over the Conservative candidate, Chris Pearson.

Lynch was a member of the Environmental Audit Committee from July  to October 2015 and was appointed to the Procedure Committee in February 2016. Lynch was appointed as an Opposition Whip in the Commons on 18 September 2015. Lynch is the chair of the All-Party Parliamentary Group on Fairtrade and a Co-Chair of the British Museum group and of the Population, Development and Reproductive Health group. Lynch has also been a member of All-Party Parliamentary Groups on Migration, Art and Health, Kashmir, Policing and Rugby Union.

She supported Owen Smith in his attempt to replace Jeremy Corbyn in the 2016 Labour leadership election.

Following the October Shadow Cabinet reshuffle and the firing of Dame Rosie Winterton as Chief Whip, Lynch resigned as a whip. She was reappointed to the front bench by Labour leader Jeremy Corbyn on 3 July 2017, taking on the role of Shadow Flooding & Coastal Communities Minister within the Environment, Food and Rural Affairs team.

In the 2019 general election, Lynch was re-elected to the Halifax constituency with 21,496 votes out of 46,458 cast, and a majority of 2,569.

Lynch endorsed Keir Starmer in the 2020 Labour Party leadership election, and was appointed as the Shadow Minister for Immigration following his victory in April 2020. She held this position until the minor reshuffle in May 2021, when she swapped roles with Bambos Charalambous to become the Shadow Minister for Crime Reduction and Courts. In the November 2021 British shadow cabinet reshuffle she was made Shadow Security Minister.

Personal life
Lynch married Chris Walker in December 2014.

Lynch is a former rugby union player for both Lancaster University and Halifax Vandals and has talked of her desire to encourage others to take up the sport.

References

External links

1986 births
Living people
Alumni of Lancaster University
Female members of the Parliament of the United Kingdom for English constituencies
Labour Party (UK) MPs for English constituencies
People educated at Brighouse High School
People from Halifax, West Yorkshire
UK MPs 2015–2017
UK MPs 2017–2019
UK MPs 2019–present
21st-century British women politicians
21st-century English women
21st-century English people